The Marketing Practice, also known as TMP, is a global, business-to-business marketing agency headquartered in Oxfordshire, England, and with offices in London, Munich and Seattle. The agency works with IT, technology and professional services companies including Microsoft, Hewlett Packard Enterprise, Salesforce, Capgemini and Telefónica O2, and has a strong focus on driving commercial results from marketing.

The B2B agency was founded by Clive McNamara in 2002 from his front room in Ardington, Oxfordshire. Early clients included Fujitsu and eGain. McNamara was formerly Marketing Director at a large IT software company. He created The Marketing Practice after being unable to find one agency that offered a fully integrated B2B marketing solution.

Work and results 

Previous achievements include generating EMEA sales of 284x marketing investment for Atos and improving the Microsoft Lumia business market share from 12% to 26%. The agency has also been recognised as being in the top three 100% revenue B2B agencies in the B2B Agencies Benchmarking Report.

Expansion 

In 2008 The Marketing Practice moved to its current premises in The Old Estate Yard, East Hendred. The agency established its first non-UK office in 2016 in Munich, Germany, and a North American office in Seattle, Washington, later the same year.

Sales and Marketing forums 

The agency runs regular Sales & Marketing Forums ('S&M Forums’) for B2B sales and marketing industry experts and senior professionals. The event was highly commended in the Best Live Initiative Category at the 2010 B2B Marketing Awards, and have since included senior speakers from Microsoft, Genpact, CEB, Salesforce, Allianz Insurance, Telefónica O2, and many others.

Industry recognition 

The Marketing Practice has been the most-awarded agency at the B2B Marketing Awards in both 2013 and 2014. They have been consistent winners in the 'Best Lead Generation' category, winning the award five times between 2010 and 2015, and the 'Most Commercially-Successful' category, winning twice between 2015 and 2017. They were also runner-up for the ‘Agency of the Year’ accolade from 2013 to 2015.

References

External links 
•The Marketing Practice official website

Companies based in Oxfordshire